 

The Schildergasse is a shopping street in central Cologne, Germany. With 13,000 people passing through it every hour, it is the busiest shopping street in Europe, according to a 2008 survey by GfK. The Schildergasse is a designated pedestrian zone and stretches for about 500 meters from the Hohe Straße at its eastern end to the Neumarkt at the western end. 

The street dates back to Roman times, when it was the city's Decumanus Maximus. During the Middle Ages it was home to many artists who painted heraldic coats of arms, whence the street's name (Schilder means signs or escutcheons). Among today's landmarks on Schildergasse are the Atoniterkirche, the oldest Protestant church in Cologne, and Peek & Cloppenburg's  Weltstadthaus, designed by Renzo Piano.

Nearby places of interest  
 Käthe Kollwitz Museum 
 Rautenstrauch Joest Museum
 Schnütgen Museum 
 Church of St. Cäcilien Basilica

See also 
 List of streets in Cologne
 List of leading shopping streets and districts by city

References

External links 

 http://www.schildergasse.de/ 

Pedestrian streets in Germany
Busking venues
Streets in Cologne
Shopping districts and streets in Germany
Tourist attractions in Cologne
Innenstadt, Cologne